The 27th edition of the Men's Asian Amateur Boxing Championships was held from June 30 to July 9, 2013 in Amman, Jordan.

Medal summary

Medal table

References
Results

External links
Asian Boxing Confederation

2013
Asian Boxing
Boxing
21st century in Amman
Sports competitions in Amman
International sports competitions hosted by Jordan